Blackdoor Miracle  is the fifth studio album by Norwegian black metal band Ragnarok, released on January March 26, 2004 under Regain Records.

Track listing 
All music by Ragnarok.
All lyrics by Espen Dyngen except "Blackdoor Miracle", "Murder", and "Kneel" by Hoest.

Personnel

Ragnarok
Hoest: Vocal
Rym: Guitars
Jerv: Bass
Jontho P.: Drums

Production and engineering 
Tommy Tägtgren - Recording, Producer, Engineering
Goran Finberg - Mastering
Jacek Wiśniewski - Layout, Artwork
Recorded in March 2003 at Abyss Studio in Pärlby, Sweden
Produced by Tommy Tägtgren and Ragnarok.
Mastered at The Mastering Room, Göteborg, Sweden.

References

External links 
Metallum Archives
Discogs.com

2004 albums
Ragnarok (Norwegian band) albums
Regain Records albums